Nasir Malik (born 22 November 1990) is a Pakistani cricketer. He played in 36 first-class and 24 List A matches between 2008 and 2018.

References

External links
 

1990 births
Living people
Pakistani cricketers
Water and Power Development Authority cricketers
Rawalpindi cricketers
Badureliya Sports Club cricketers
Sui Southern Gas Company cricketers
Cricketers from Rawalpindi